J48 may refer to:
 Gyroelongated pentagonal birotunda
 , a paddle steamer of the Royal Navy
 Pratt & Whitney J48, a turbojet engine
 J48, an implementation of the C4.5 algorithm